Nathan Paulse (born 7 April 1982 in Cape Town, Western Cape) is a South African Football Coach and retired professional footballer who played as a striker for Ajax Cape Town and was capped at international level for South Africa. As a professional footballer he played at the elite professional level in South Africa and Sweden from the age of 17 until 37. He recently was the Assistant Coach of Cape Town Spurs 1st Team who plays in the South African National First Division. He is also the owner of Starting XI Revolution Career Development Service, a company specialising in elite athlete mindset development for both amateur and professional footballers in Southern Africa. Paulse was also an Supersport 4 television pundit, sharing his analysis of local PSL matches as well frequent contributions to print media.

Career 
He left Ajax Cape Town in the summer of 2008, signing a three-and-one-half-year contract with Swedish club Hammarby IF.

He played his first game for Hammarby the same day that he signed for them, when Hammarby faced Malmö FF and won 4–2. He scored his first goal for the club in the Swedish Cup quarterfinal against Valsta Syrianska IK. Despite a successful first season, he failed to impress during the two following seasons and, when Hammarby was relegated at the end of the 2009 season, he moved on loan to his former team Ajax Cape Town FC from 1 January 2010 to 30 June 2010 with a buy-out clause. Following the 2016–17 season, Paulse retired from play.

Honours

Club
Ajax Cape Town
 MTN 8: 2015

References

External links 

1982 births
South African soccer players
South Africa international soccer players
South African expatriate soccer players
Living people
Cape Town Spurs F.C. players
Bloemfontein Celtic F.C. players
Platinum Stars F.C. players
SuperSport United F.C. players
Hammarby Fotboll players
South African Premier Division players
Allsvenskan players
Cape Coloureds
Expatriate footballers in Sweden
Sportspeople from Cape Town
Association football forwards